SOAT may refer  to

SOAT1, an enzyme and human gene on chromosome 1 
SOAT2, an enzyme and human gene on  chromosome 12 
Sudan Organisation Against Torture, a London-based human rights group
Snakes on a Train, a 2006 thriller film